Moulinet is a commune in the Alpes-Maritimes department in southeastern France.

Population

See also
Col de Turini
Communes of the Alpes-Maritimes department

References

External links
Welcome site

Communes of Alpes-Maritimes
Alpes-Maritimes communes articles needing translation from French Wikipedia